Francis Tamisy Raharison is a Malagasy politician.  A former member of the National Assembly of Madagascar, he was elected as a member of the Tiako I Madagasikara party; he represented the constituency of Anosibe An'ala.

References

Year of birth missing (living people)
Living people
Members of the National Assembly (Madagascar)
Tiako I Madagasikara politicians